Marcelo Rebolledo (born 22 October 1971) is a Chilean former professional tennis player.

Rebolledo was a member of Chile's Davis Cup team between 1994 and 1996, playing in three doubles rubbers. He partnered Gabriel Silberstein twice and Marcelo Ríos once. At ATP Tour level he made his only main draw appearance in doubles at the 1994 Chile Open, where he and Àlex Corretja reached the semi-finals.

ATP Challenger titles

Doubles: (1)

See also
List of Chile Davis Cup team representatives

References

External links
 
 
 

1971 births
Living people
Chilean male tennis players